Have a Little Faith is a 20-episode Singaporean drama produced and telecast on Mediacorp Channel 8.  The show aired at 9pm on weekdays and had a repeat telecast at 8am the following day. It stars Rui En, Zhang Zhenhuan, Jeffrey Xu, Chen Shucheng, Jayley Woo and Marcus Chin as the casts of this series.

Casts

Main Casts 
{| class="wikitable"
|-
!style="background:#f2dfc6"| Cast 
!style="background:#f2dfc6"| Character 
!style="background:#f2dfc6"| Description
!style="background:#f2dfc6"| Episodes Appeared
!Ref
|-
| Rui En  瑞恩 || Liang Sijie  梁思洁 ||
Younger version portrayed by Toh Xin Hui  Teenage version portrayed by Shanice Koh (16y/o)  
 Jiang Xiaoxi (江晓溪)  
Shen Mingren and Zhou Jiannan's love interest 
Zhou Fangdong's tenant
Shen Mingren, Qian Zaide and Zhuang Kelian's co-tenant
In love with Shen Mingren
Qian Leqi's best friend
Suffered from schizophrenia

|| 1-2, 8, 11 (young)  1, 6, 10, 13 (teenage)  1-20
|
|-
| Zhang Zhenhuan  张振寰 || Shen Mingren  沈明仁 ||Mysterious Man (神秘人), Serial Killer (凶手)
Former fashion designer
Qian Leqi's love interest/idol
Liang Siyu's ex-boyfriend 
Zhou Jiannan's rival in love
Zhou Fangdong's tenant
Jiang Xiaoxi, Qian Zaide and Zhuang Kelian's co-tenant
In love with Liang Sijie
|| 1-11, 14-20
|
|-
| Jeffrey Xu  徐鸣杰 || Zhou Jiannan  周建南 || 
Steven Chow, Wretched Man (死贱男)
Formal assistant director, former Accountant
Zhou Fangdong and Zhang Huixian's son
Zhou Jiayi's younger brother
Sky Kim's maternal uncle
Kim Moo-jeon's brother-in-law
In love with Liang Sijie & Qian Leqi
Shen Mingren's rival in love
|| 1-20
|
|-
| Chen Shucheng  陈澍城 || Zhou Fangdong  周方东 ||Mr Landlord (房东先生), Fortune Teller (算命神算, Clairvoyant Of The East Seas (东海神算)Fortune teller
Liang Sijie, Shen Mingren, Zhuang Kelian and Qian Zaide's landlord
Zhang Huixian's husband 
Kim Moo-jeon's father-in-law
Zhou Jiannan and Zhou Jiayi's father
Zhang Tiansheng and Old Wang's best friend
Sky Kim's maternal grandfather
|| 1-20
|
|-
| Jayley Woo  胡佳琪 || Qian Leqi  钱乐琪 ||Money Happy QiAspiring Actress
Qian Zaide's daughter 
In love with Shen Mingren and Zhou Jiannan
Liang Sijie's best-friend
Has kleptomania whenever she is feeling down
|| 1-2, 4-9, 11-20
|
|-
| Marcus Chin 陈建彬 || Qian Zaide  钱载德 || Deadbeat (欠载的), 4D King (多多王/马票王), Uncle De (德叔)Ex-Security guard and Ex- private car hire driver
Coffee shop's cleaner
Qian Leqi's father
Zhou Fangdong's tenant
Jiang Xiaoxi, Shen Mingren and Zhuang Kelian's co-tenant
|| 1-10, 12-17, 19-20
|
|-
|}

 Supporting Casts 

 Other Casts 

Original Sound Track (OST)

Awards & Nominations

Star Awards 2018Have a Little Faith''' is up for 4 nominations.

The other drama serials also nominated for Best Drama Serial with Mightiest Mother In Law, When Duty Calls , While We Are Young & My Friends from Afar.

It did not win a single nomination.

Development
Filming started on 6 February 2017 and wrapped on 18 April 2017

See also
List of MediaCorp Channel 8 Chinese drama series (2010s)

References 

Mediacorp Chinese language programmes
2017 Singaporean television series debuts
2017 Singaporean television series endings
2010s Singaporean television series
Channel 8 (Singapore) original programming